Cecil Glenford Bolton (February 13, 1904 – August 25, 1993) was a Major League Baseball first baseman for the Cleveland Indians near the end of the 1928 season (September 21 – September 30).

Bolton had two hits in thirteen at bats (.154), but both hits were triples, giving him a slugging percentage of .462. He shares the record with Ed Irvin for most triples in a career with no other hits at two.  He scored one run.  At first base, he handled 42 out of 44 chances successfully for a .955 fielding percentage.

External links
Baseball Reference
Retrosheet

1904 births
1993 deaths
Major League Baseball first basemen
Baseball players from Mississippi
Cleveland Indians players
Mississippi State Bulldogs baseball players
People from Booneville, Mississippi
Cleveland A's players